Metallochlora is a genus of moths in the family Geometridae described by Warren in 1896.

Species
Some species are:
Metallochlora ametalla Turner, 1910
Metallochlora grisea (Prout, 1915)
Metallochlora lineata Warren, 1896 (Australia)
Metallochlora meeki Warren, 1896
Metallochlora militaris (Lucas, 1891) (Australia)
Metallochlora neomela (Meyrick, 1889)
Metallochlora venusta (Warren, 1896) (Australia, Papua New Guinea)

References

Geometrinae